Equestrian Australia (EA) is the national governing body for equestrian sports in Australia. These sports include the FEI-recognized disciplines of dressage, eventing, show jumping, equestrian vaulting, endurance riding, reining, para-equestrian, and combined driving. EA also develops and enforces the rules for other events at horse shows.

History
The body was founded in 1951 as the Equestrian Federation of Australia and was formally affiliated with the International Federation for Equestrian Sports in May of that year. On 14 November 2008, the Equestrian Federation of Australia changed its name to Equestrian Australia Limited, with the trading name of Equestrian Australia.

See also

 Sport in Australia

References

External links
 

AUS
Sports governing bodies in Australia
Equestrian sports in Australia
1951 establishments in Australia
Sports organizations established in 1951
Para Dressage